The Boogeyman is a 1980 American supernatural slasher film written and directed by Ulli Lommel, and starring Suzanna Love, John Carradine, and Ron James. The film's title refers to the long-held superstition of boogeymen beings, and its plot concerns two siblings who are targeted by the ghost of their mother's deceased boyfriend which has been freed from a mirror.

Released theatrically in November 1980 by the independent distributor the Jerry Gross Organization, The Boogeyman was a box-office hit, grossing $25 million internationally.

The film has received mixed to negative critical reviews, with criticism mainly regarding the heavy similarities from earlier horror films such as Halloween, The Exorcist, and The Amityville Horror. The film was followed by two sequels: Boogeyman II and Return of the Boogeyman.

Plot
Young siblings Willy and Lacey watch their mother and her boyfriend kissing in her bedroom. When their mother notices them, she has her boyfriend tie Willy to his headboard before sending Lacey to her room. Lacey frees Willy from his bed and Willy enters their room and repeatedly stabs his mother's boyfriend with a chef knife in front of a large mirror.

Twenty years later, Lacey, now an adult, is married with a young son and lives with her aunt and uncle on a farm. Willy also lives with them, but has been mute since the night he killed his mother's boyfriend. One night over dinner, Lacey finds a letter in the mail from her mother, who claims to be on her deathbed and wishes to see them one last time, but Willy burns the letter.

Lacey suffers from nightmares, and has a particularly frightening dream where she is dragged, tied to a bed and almost stabbed by an unseen entity. Her husband, Jake, takes her to a psychiatrist to help her confront her fears, and decides to go visit the house she grew up in. They arrive not knowing who is actually living there and meet two teenage girls and their younger brother. Their parents, the homeowners, have apparently just placed the home for sale and then gone out of town. The daughter thinks Lacey and Jake have been sent by the real estate company to view the house. Jake and Lacey pretend they want to buy the house so they can look around. At the house, Lacey sees a reflection of her mother's deceased boyfriend coming towards her in a mirror inside the bedroom where he died, and smashes the mirror in a panic with a chair. Her husband takes the broken mirror with him in an attempt to repair it, but a piece is left behind which later glows red. Shortly after, the teenage girls and their brother are all violently killed by an unseen force; the vengeful spirit of the deceased lover has been released from the mirror.

Willy similarly has disturbing visions involving mirrors, which cause him to paint all the mirrors in the house black. Later, pieces of a broken mirror in a bag at his feet cause a pitchfork to levitate and nearly impale him. A shard from the broken mirror becomes stuck to Lacey's son's shoe and is left on the ground where the light refracts across a lake where a group of teenagers are partying by an abandoned house. A couple are soon impaled by a screwdriver as they are kissing in their car, while another couple drives off and leaves them. Soon after, Lacey flees to get in the house, only to see that her shirt supernaturally starts to tear apart. This also leads her to discover her aunt and uncle dead in the barn.

Later, Lacey's husband brings in the family priest to investigate the mirror, only to see that when the priest's hand touches the mirror, it suddenly turns red. A piece of the mirror floats across the room and becomes lodged over Lacey's eye, letting the ghost possess her body. Controlling Lacey's body, the ghost nearly kills her husband and attacks the priest. Before he dies, the priest removes the shard from Lacey's eye, releasing her from the ghost's control, and throws it into the kitchen sink, where it bursts into flames as it touches the water. The remainder of the mirror is then thrown into a well, where the same thing happens, as an explosion releases the trapped souls and destroys the mirror once and for all.

The film ends with Lacey, her brother and Kevin visiting the graveyard. After they leave, the final shard of the mirror on the ground, which had gotten stuck to her son's shoe, glows red.

Cast
 Suzanna Love as Lacey
 Ron James as Jake
 John Carradine as Dr. Warren
 Nicholas Love as Willy
 Raymond Boyden as Kevin

Analysis
Though the film has been noted as stylistically imitating John Carpenter's Halloween (1978), critic Jeff Franzen notes that the film possess a subtext that is filled with "multi-layered references to Lommel's childhood and fears, much of which lingers long after you forget about the gimmicky gore". Franzen asserts that one of the film's central themes is "that people conspire to hide the truth, although to one or more characters the truth is obvious".

Production

Concept

The film also uses several apparent pieces of folklore and superstition regarding mirrors—as well as the belief that it is bad luck to break a mirror, the film also discusses the belief that breaking a mirror releases everything the mirror has ever 'seen' and that placing the pieces of a broken mirror into a bag and burying it will counteract the bad luck from breaking the mirror. Additionally, there is the belief that a mirror in a room where someone has died will show the dead person looking back over the shoulder of anyone looking into the mirror. All this was used in the Mexican translation of the film title, released as "El espejo asesino" ("the killer mirror").

Stylistically, Lommel stated that he wanted to make a "movie about outrageous killings set in an average-looking environment with ordinary actors. First establish things an audience can identify with, then inject the horror into a normal environment".

Filming
Filming took place on location in the Waldorf, Maryland area, with additional photography occurring in Los Angeles, California.

Release

Box office
The film was given a limited release theatrically in the United States by The Jerry Gross Organization with screenings beginning on November 14, 1980.

The film grossed approximately $25 million, though little of its significant income went to the filmmakers and performers, as the Jerry Gross Company, the film's distributor, was in the midst of bankruptcy at the time of its release.

Critical response
Critical reception for The Boogeyman has been mixed to negative. The review aggregator website Rotten Tomatoes reports that 17% of 6 critics gave the film a positive review, with an average rating of 4.1/10.

Garry Arnold from The Washington Post wrote in his review on the film: "The Boogey Man achieves a certain vicious distinction by putting the occasional spectacular kink in an otherwise motley fabric". Ron Cowan of The Statesman Journal criticized the film for boasting "little originality in storyline or style, relying instead on the sheer energy and determination it brings to bloodletting". Bruce Bailey of the Montreal Gazette wrote: "This film is so sick, it ought to be hospitalizedpermanently. The Boogey Man mixes a bit of sex with standard shock devices, primordial fears and Freudian jealousies. It blends them into something which is tawdry, rather than a good old-fashioned spine-tingler". 

Film critic Leonard Maltin gave the film a favorable 3 out of 4 stars: "German art film actor-director Lommel lends unconventional angle to this combination of The Exorcist and Halloween. Effects are quite colorful, if somewhat hokey".

Home media
The film was released on VHS in the United States by Wizard Video in 1981. The film has been released on DVD twice in North America: The first release was in 1999 by Anchor Bay Entertainment alongside Lommel's The Devonsville Terror (1983). It was subsequently re-released by Sony Pictures Home Entertainment in 2005 alongside Lommel's Return of the Boogeyman (1994).

In the United Kingdom, The Boogeyman was placed on the DPP list in 1984, but was later re-released on the Vipco label in 1992 in a cut form. In 2000 it was released uncut. 88 Films released a Blu-ray edition in the United Kingdom in 2015.

Sequels
Boogeyman II was filmed in 1981, but unreleased until 1983. Directed by Bruce Starr and an uncredited Ulli Lommel, it was written by Starr, Lommel and the original film's star, Suzanna Love, although the writing goes uncredited in the film. In Boogeyman 2, Lacey is approached by a group of Hollywood phonies to make a movie based on her experiences. Lacey travels to Hollywood, to the home of a film director (played by Ulli Lommel himself), where she brings along the last surviving haunted mirror shard from the end of the first movie as proof to her horrifying experiences. One by one, the phonies are killed by the mirror spirit who possesses the body of the director's manservant. Boogeyman 2 is padded with many flashback sequences from the first film.

Return of the Boogeyman (or Boogeyman 3) was released on May 5, 1994, and is largely constructed around numerous flashbacks to The Boogeyman as well.

In 2016 Hollywood Action House began developing Boogeyman Chronicles, a series of eight 45-min. episodes. The series started with the first episode airing on Halloween 2018 worldwide. It is inspired by Ulli Lommel's 1980 cult hit The Boogeyman. The new storyline was developed after test audiences in the US and Europe saw various cuts of a series of plot-possibilities and characters entitled Boogeyman: Reincarnation. The writing team headed by Colin McCracken is currently working on episodes 2 - 8 with the plan to create a total of up to 64 episodes. Lommel has indicated that, even though he directed episode 1, most of the remaining episodes will be directed by a series of young directors from the US, Europe and Asia. Starring in episode 1 are Skylar Radzion, Laurence R. Harvey, Andreea Boyer and Tristan Risk. It was produced by Frank Dragun, Ulli Lommel and David Bond.

Notes

References

Sources

External links
 
 
 

1980s English-language films
1980 films
1980 horror films
1980 independent films
1980 thriller films
1980s horror thriller films
1980s slasher films
1980s supernatural horror films
1980s teen horror films
American horror thriller films
American slasher films
American supernatural horror films
American teen horror films
Films directed by Ulli Lommel
Films shot in Los Angeles
Films shot in Maryland
Video nasties
1980s American films